|}

The International Trial was a Listed flat horse race in Great Britain open to horses aged three years only. It was run over a distance of 1 mile and 1 yard at Lingfield Park in April.

The race was first run in 2002, and was awarded Listed status in 2003.  In 2018 the Burradon Stakes (Listed), run over the same distance on Newcastle's Good Friday fixture, became a Listed race in its place, effectively moving the race from Lingfield Park.

Records

Leading jockey (4 wins):
 Richard Hughes – Party Boss (2005), Sharp Nephew (2008), Dubawi Gold (2011), Van Der Neer (2013)

Leading trainer (3 wins):
 Brian Meehan – Buy The Sport (2003), Leitrim House (2004), Sharp Nephew (2008)

Winners

See also 
Horse racing in Great Britain
List of British flat horse races

References

Racing Post:

Lingfield Park Racecourse
Flat races in Great Britain
Flat horse races for three-year-olds
Recurring sporting events established in 2002
2002 establishments in England
Recurring sporting events disestablished in 2018
2018 disestablishments in England
Discontinued horse races